Andreas Hartø (born 26 July 1988) is a Danish professional golfer.

In August 2010, Hartø became just the fourth amateur to win on the European Challenge Tour when he captured the ECCO Tour Championship. He turned professional later in 2010, winning on the Challenge Tour for a second time in October of that year. This was still only his fourth event on the tour, making him the quickest ever to two wins at that level. On 10 December 2010, he qualified for the European Tour 2011 season, at the European Tour Qualifying School held at PGA Catalunja Resort in Spain. He picked up his third victory on the Challenge Tour in 2012 at the D+D Real Czech Challenge Open.

Amateur wins
2009 Welsh Open Amateur Stroke Play Championship

Professional wins (3)

Challenge Tour wins (3)

1Co-sanctioned by the Danish Golf Tour

Challenge Tour playoff record (1–0)

Results in major championships

CUT = missed the half-way cut
Note: Hartø only played in the U.S. Open.

Team appearances
Amateur
European Amateur Team Championship (representing Denmark): 2009, 2010

See also
2010 European Tour Qualifying School graduates
2012 Challenge Tour graduates
2013 European Tour Qualifying School graduates

References

External links
 

Danish male golfers
European Tour golfers
Sportspeople from Copenhagen
1988 births
Living people